Koyanovo is the name of several rural localities in Russia:

Koyanovo, Perm Krai, village in Permsky District, Perm Krai
Koyanovo, Birsky District, Republic of Bashkortostan, village in Birsky District, Republic of Bashkortostan
Koyanovo, Kaltasinsky District, Republic of Bashkortostan, village in Kaltasinsky District, Republic of Bashkortostan